CMES is an abbreviation which may refer to any of the following:

 Center for Middle Eastern Studies (disambiguation)
 International Strategic Research Organization (ISRO) Center for Middle East and Africa Studies in Ankara, Turkey
 Center for Mass Education in Science at Dhaka University, Bangladesh

See also
 CME (disambiguation)